Kar Kam (also Romanized as Kār Kam) is a village in Peyrajeh Rural District, in the Central District of Neka County, Mazandaran Province, Iran. At the 2006 census, its population was 344, in 95 families.

References 

Populated places in Neka County